Blastobasis inderskella is a moth in the family Blastobasidae. It was described by Aristide Caradja in 1920. It is found in Uralsk, Russia.

References

Arctiidae genus list at Butterflies and Moths of the World of the Natural History Museum

Blastobasis
Moths described in 1920